Enderson Alves Moreira (born 28 September 1971), known as Enderson Moreira, is a Brazilian football manager, currently in charge of Sport Recife.

Managerial career
Born in Belo Horizonte, Minas Gerais, Moreira had a Physical Education graduation before joining América Mineiro's youth setup in 1995, as a fitness coach. In 1996, after being appointed manager of the under-20s, he led the side to the first Copa São Paulo de Futebol Júnior title of their history. Moreira later was in charge of local lower clubs, and after another stint at América, was appointed as Atlético Mineiro's under-20 manager. He later moved to the latter's fierce rivals Cruzeiro, again finishing first in Copinha.

On 26 October 2008 Moreira was appointed Ipatinga manager, after previously being the club's assistant manager. After failing to avoid relegation with the club, he subsequently returned to youth football.

On 23 December 2009, after a spell at Atlético Paranaense, Moreira was named Sport Club Internacional B manager. On 21 March 2011 he was appointed assistant manager at Fluminense, but acted as the club's interim for two months.

On 28 September 2011 Moreira was appointed at the helm of Goiás. He led the club to a Série B title in 2012, and also achieved an impressive sixth position in the following year's Série A, but opted to not renew his contract in December 2013.

On 16 December 2013 Moreira signed for Grêmio, but was relieved from his duties on 27 July 2014. On 3 September he was appointed Santos manager, replacing fired Oswaldo de Oliveira.

On 5 March 2015 Moreira was sacked, despite the club's unbeaten status in the year. On the 16th he was named manager of Atlético Paranaense, replacing fired Claudinei Oliveira. His spell at the latter didn't last long, and he was relieved from his duties on 20 April.

On 21 May 2015 Moreira returned to Fluminense, after Ricardo Drubscky's dismissal. Dismissed on 15 September after a 1–4 heavy loss against Palmeiras, he returned to Goiás on 15 December ahead of the 2016 campaign.

Moreira was fired by the Esmeraldino on 8 June 2016, with the club in the relegation places. On 20 July he signed for América Mineiro, seriously threatened with relegation in the top tier; after improving the club's performance overall, he still failed to avoid the drop three matches before the end of the tournament.

In 2017, Moreira led América back to the Série A, after winning the Série B tournament. On 16 June 2018, he resigned from the club, and was announced after accepting an offer from fellow top division club Bahia.

On 1 April 2019, after being knocked out of the year's Copa do Nordeste, Moreira was dismissed by Bahia. Late in the month, he replaced fired Lisca at the helm of Ceará, but was himself sacked on 1 October.

On 10 February 2020, Moreira returned to Ceará, replacing sacked Argel Fucks, but resigned on 17 March to take over Cruzeiro the following day. He was relieved of his duties on 8 September, after a 1–1 home draw against CRB, and returned to Goiás on the 28th; his spell at the latter club also did not last long, as he was sacked on 17 November after ten winless matches.

On 7 January 2021, Moreira replaced Marcelo Chamusca at the helm of Fortaleza, still in the top tier. He was sacked on 25 April, after being knocked out of the 2021 Copa do Nordeste.

On 20 July 2021, Moreira again replaced Chamusca, now in charge of Botafogo. He led the club back to the top tier as champions, but was still sacked the following 11 February.

On 26 June 2022, Moreira returned to Bahia, in the place of sacked Guto Ferreira, but was himself dismissed on 1 October. On 18 November, he was named in charge of Sport Recife for the upcoming season.

Managerial statistics

Honours
América Mineiro
 Copa São Paulo de Futebol Júnior: 1996
 Campeonato Brasileiro Série B: 2017

Cruzeiro
 Copa São Paulo de Futebol Júnior: 2007 
 Campeonato Brasileiro Sub-20: 2007

Internacional
 Copa Sub-23: 2010

Goiás
 Campeonato Goiano: 2012, 2013, 2016
 Campeonato Brasileiro Série B: 2012

Botafogo
 Campeonato Brasileiro Série B: 2021

References

External links
 
 
 Lancepedia profile 

1971 births
Living people
Sportspeople from Belo Horizonte
Brazilian football managers
Campeonato Brasileiro Série A managers
Campeonato Brasileiro Série B managers
Ipatinga Futebol Clube managers
Fluminense FC managers
Goiás Esporte Clube managers
Grêmio Foot-Ball Porto Alegrense managers
Santos FC managers
Club Athletico Paranaense managers
América Futebol Clube (MG) managers
Esporte Clube Bahia managers
Ceará Sporting Club managers
Cruzeiro Esporte Clube managers
Fortaleza Esporte Clube managers
Botafogo de Futebol e Regatas managers
Sport Club do Recife managers